One Superior Place is a 502 ft (153m) tall skyscraper in Chicago, Illinois. It was constructed between 1998 to 1999 and has 52 floors. The building was designed by Loewenberg + Associates, and it is tied with 10 South LaSalle as the 87th tallest building in Chicago. 

The property is managed by Greystar Real Estate Partners.

The main floor of the building includes a Whole Foods, Roy's Restaurant and approximately four shops, while the upper floors are residential apartments. There is a five level above-ground self-park parking garage which offers parking on a daily and monthly basis, and an underground parking garage for Whole Foods.

The property primarily consists of residential rental properties, but some units are offered as furnished corporate housing or vacation rentals.

See also
List of tallest buildings in Chicago

References

External links
One Superior Place website

Chicago Architecture

Residential skyscrapers in Chicago
Buildings and structures completed in 1999
1999 establishments in Illinois